Lake Bavaria is a lake in Carver County, Minnesota, in the United States.

Lake Bavaria was named after the German state of Bavaria, the native homeland of some of the first settlers.

See also
List of lakes in Minnesota

References

Lakes of Minnesota
Lakes of Carver County, Minnesota